Hatiteh may refer to:
 Hatiteh, Bardaskan
 Hatiteh, Joghatai